Reichelt may refer to:

People
Bernd Reichelt, German politician
Franz Reichelt (1879–1912), Austrian-born French tailor and inventor
Hannes Reichelt (born 1980), Austrian alpine ski racer  
Helmut Reichelt (born 1939), German Marxist economist and philosopher
Ingeborg Reichelt (born 1928), German soprano singer
Julian Reichelt (born 1980), German journalist
Julius Reichelt (1637–1717), German mathematician and astronomer 
Kalle Reichelt (1933–2016), Norwegian medical researcher
Karl Ludvig Reichelt (1877–1952), Lutheran missionary
Patrick Reichelt (born 1988), German–Filipino footballer
Paul Reichelt (1898–1981), Generalleutnant in the Wehrmacht
Rudolf Reichelt (1890–?), German rower
Tom Reichelt (born 1982), German cross country skier

Companies
, German mail order company

Surnames from given names